Ionel Pârvu (born 23 June 1970, in Argeş) is a former Romanian football player.

International career
Pârvu made one appearance at international level for Romania on 22 September 1993 under coach Anghel Iordănescu in a friendly match which ended with a 1–0 victory against Israel.

Honours
Steaua București
Liga I: 1992–93, 1993–94, 1994–95, 1995–96
Cupa României: 1995–96
Supercupa României: 1994
SV Sandhausen
 Oberliga Baden-Württemberg: 2000

References

External links

1970 births
Living people
Romanian footballers
Romania international footballers
Romanian expatriate footballers
FC Brașov (1936) players
FC Steaua București players
PAOK FC players
Fortuna Düsseldorf players
SV Sandhausen players
FCV Farul Constanța players
FC Metalurh Zaporizhzhia players
SC Tavriya Simferopol players
FC Politehnica Iași (1945) players
FC Chernomorets Novorossiysk players
Russian Premier League players
Expatriate footballers in Russia
Super League Greece players
Liga I players
Ukrainian Premier League players
Expatriate footballers in Greece
Expatriate footballers in Ukraine
Romanian expatriate sportspeople in Ukraine
Expatriate footballers in Germany
Association football midfielders
People from Argeș County